Paula Hart (born Paula Joan Voje, April 25, 1956) is an American producer. She is a principal of Hartbreak Films along with daughter, actress Melissa Joan Hart.

Her work includes production credits for Sabrina the Teenage Witch, and two television movies on the Lifetime Network, The Watcher in the Woods (2017) and A Very Merry Toy Store (2017); Hart also served as director of the latter.

Personal life
On February 6, 1972, Hart married a shellfish wholesaler, William Hart and divorced in 1990. Together, they have 5 children, Melissa Joan Hart, Trisha Hart, Elizabeth Hart, Brian Hart and Emily Hart.

On September 18, 1994, Hart married Leslie Gilliams, who later competed on Season 5 of the American version of MasterChef in 2014, finishing in 3rd place. Together, they have two daughters, Alexandra Gilliams and Samantha Gilliams.

In September 2010, Hart and her husband purchased an estate in Malibu, California for $2.6 million USD.

Filmography

References

External links

1956 births
Living people
American television producers
American women film producers
American women television producers
21st-century American women